Alan Duncan (born 1957) is a British Conservative Party politician.

Alan Duncan may also refer to:

 Alan Duncan (cricketer) (born 1980), Scottish cricketer
 Alan James Duncan (1938–1999), Scottish atomic physicist
 Alan Kendall Duncan (born 1965), American physician
 Alan S. Duncan (born 1965), British economist and econometrician

See also 
 Alan Gomme-Duncan (1893–1963), British Army officer